Anthony Baron (born 29 December 1992) is a professional footballer who plays as a centre-back for Swiss club Servette FC. He represents the Guadeloupean national team.

Career
Baron began his career with Lormont, and spent his early career with various semi-professional sides in France. He made appearances for Bourges Foot, FC Chartres, Amiens reserves, Beauvais Oise and Saint-Pryvé. In 2019, he proceeded to move to Switzerland and signed for Stade Nyonnais. On 16 June 2021, he signed a contract with Yverdon Sport in the Swiss Challenge League.

On 20 July 2022, Baron moved to Servette U21, the under-21 team of Servette, who were allowed to sign more experienced players.

International career
Baron debuted for the Guadeloupe national team in a 0–0 CONCACAF Nations League tie with Aruba on 16 October 2018. He was likewise called up to represent Guadeloupe at the 2021 CONCACAF Gold Cup.

References

External links
 
 

1992 births
Living people
People from Villepinte, Seine-Saint-Denis
Guadeloupean footballers
Guadeloupe international footballers
French footballers
French people of Guadeloupean descent
Bourges Foot players
FC Stade Nyonnais players
Yverdon-Sport FC players
Servette FC players
Championnat National 2 players
Championnat National 3 players
Association football defenders
2021 CONCACAF Gold Cup players
Guadeloupean expatriate footballers
Guadeloupean expatriate sportspeople in Switzerland
French expatriate footballers
French expatriate sportspeople in Switzerland
Expatriate footballers in Switzerland
Footballers from Seine-Saint-Denis